Weichong C. Marwing (born 14 March 1970 in South Africa) is a Thoroughbred horse racing jockey. Based in South Africa, he has won a number of important international Group One races. He is well remembered for riding Irridescence to victory over the great Ouija Board in the 2006 Queen Elizabeth II Cup at Sha Tin Racecourse in Hong Kong. In 2007, for trainer Mike De Kock he won his second United Arab Emirates Derby at Nad Al Sheba Racecourse aboard Asiatic Boy, a horse he says is the best he has ever ridden.

His brother, Weiho Marwing, is also involved in Thoroughbred racing and is a trainer in South Africa.

References
 Weichong Marwing profile

1970 births
Living people
South African jockeys